The Wilson County Courthouse and Jail are located in Floresville, Texas. They were added to the National Register of Historic Places in Texas in 1978 and the courthouse as a Recorded Texas Historic Landmark in 1984.

Architect Alfred Giles used local brick for the Italianate design. The courthouse was remodeled in the 1930s, when the bricks were plastered over, and again in the 1950s. Giles also designed the Brooks County Courthouse, Fredericksburg Memorial Library,  Live Oak County Courthouse, Presidio County Courthouse, Webb County Courthouse as well as courthouses in the counties of Goliad and Kerr. In 1909, Giles designed the facade of the Kendall County Courthouse. He also designed the 1885 Llano County courthouse, which burned down in 1892.

Jailhouse Museum
In use until 1974, the white brick and stucco cubic jail was designed in 1887 by James Riely Gordon and built at the NE corner of the square. Contractor B.B. Reid erected the building for $14,000. General living quarters are on the ground floor, with the prisoner cells on the second floor separated from the second-floor bedrooms. Pauly Jail Building and Manufacturing Company manufactured the pre-fab cell blocks.

The jail is now operated by the Wilson County Historical Society as the Wilson County Jailhouse Museum. Visitors can view the original jail cells.  The museum is open the first Saturday of the month and for special events.

See also

National Register of Historic Places listings in Wilson County, Texas
List of county courthouses in Texas
Recorded Texas Historic Landmarks in Wilson County

References

External links

 Wilson County Jailhouse Museum - Wilson County Historical Society
 National Register of Historic Places nomination form for Wilson County Courthouse, National Park Service

Buildings and structures in Wilson County, Texas
Jails on the National Register of Historic Places in Texas
County courthouses in Texas
Courthouses on the National Register of Historic Places in Texas
Recorded Texas Historic Landmarks
Museums in Wilson County, Texas
Prison museums in the United States
National Register of Historic Places in Wilson County, Texas
Jails in Texas